The New Zealand cricket team toured Australia in November and December 2019 to play three Test matches. The Test series was played for the Trans-Tasman Trophy and formed part of the inaugural 2019–2021 ICC World Test Championship. The first Test was a day/night match at the Perth Stadium. Cricket Australia confirmed the fixtures for the tour in May 2019. New Zealand returned to Australia in March 2020 to play three One Day International (ODI) matches for the Chappell–Hadlee Trophy.

In the first Test, Aleem Dar of Pakistan stood in his 129th Test match as an on-field umpire, surpassing Jamaican Steve Bucknor's record of officiating in the most Test matches. Ahead of the fourth day of the second Test match, Australia's Peter Siddle announced his retirement from international cricket. Australia won the first two Test matches to take an unassailable lead, and therefore retaining the Trans-Tasman Trophy. Australia won the third and final Test match by 279 runs, therefore winning the series 3–0. It was the first time that New Zealand had been whitewashed in a three-match Test series in Australia. During the third Test, Ross Taylor went past Stephen Fleming's career total of 7,172 runs to become the leading run-scorer for New Zealand in Test cricket.

Ahead of the first ODI, Cricket Australia confirmed that all three ODIs would be played without crowd attendance, in an attempt to reduce the impact of the COVID-19 pandemic. Despite the first ODI being played, the second and third ODIs were called off on 14 March 2020, as a result of new travel restrictions being implemented in response to the coronavirus pandemic. Both Cricket Australia and New Zealand Cricket have expressed their interest to reschedule the remaining ODI matches at a later date. On 28 May 2020, Cricket Australia confirmed the fixtures for a rescheduled three match ODI series against New Zealand in January and February 2021.

Squads

Peter Siddle was added to Australia's squad ahead of the second Test after Josh Hazlewood was ruled out due to a hamstring strain. Kyle Jamieson was added to New Zealand's squad ahead of the second Test after Lockie Ferguson was ruled out due to a calf strain. Mitchell Swepson was added to Australia's squad ahead of the third Test. Trent Boult was ruled out of the third Test after fracturing his right hand during the second Test. William Somerville was named as Boult's replacement. Ahead of the third Test, Glenn Phillips was added to New Zealand's squad, as cover for Kane Williamson and Henry Nicholls who were suffering with flu-like symptoms.

Ahead of the first ODI, Sean Abbott was added to Australia's squad, as cover for Kane Richardson who reported symptoms of COVID-19. However, he tested negative and re-joined the squad during the first ODI. Following the first ODI, New Zealand's Lockie Ferguson was placed in quarantine after he reported that he had a sore throat.

Test series

1st Test

2nd Test

3rd Test

ODI series

1st ODI

2nd ODI

3rd ODI

Notes

References

External links
 Series home at ESPN Cricinfo

2019 in Australian cricket
2019 in New Zealand cricket
2019–20 Australian cricket season
2020 in Australian cricket
2020 in New Zealand cricket
International cricket competitions in 2019–20
New Zealand cricket tours of Australia
Cricket events postponed due to the COVID-19 pandemic